The men's mass start in the 2011–12 ISU Speed Skating World Cup was contested over three races on three occasions, out of a total of seven World Cup occasions for the season, with the first occasion involving the event taking place in Astana, Kazakhstan, on 25–27 November 2011, and the final occasion taking place in Berlin, Germany, on 9–11 March 2012.

Alexis Contin of France won the cup, while Jorrit Bergsma of the Netherlands came second, and Jonathan Kuck of the United States came third.

The mass start was a new event for the season.

Top three

Race medallists

Standings 
''Standings as of 11 March 2012 (end of the season).

References 

Men mass start